Gautam Deb is an Indian politician. He served as the Housing Minister in the Communist Party of India (Marxist) led Left Front government of West Bengal. He was a MLA, elected from Hasnabad constituency defeating, Rafiqul Islam Mondal of the Trinamool Congress in 2006 and 2001, and of Congress in 1996, Anath Bandhu Mitra of Congress in 1991 and Ananta Roy of Congress in 1987.

In the 2011 Assembly Election of West Bengal he filed his candidature from Dum Dum where he was defeated by Bratya Basu, the Bengali dramatist, director and actor who was a newcomer to politics. He was one of the 26 ministers who lost in this historic defeat of the Left Front government. However, his did not deter Deb who is still fighting against TMC and inspiring many through his speeches.

He is a member of the Central Committee of the Communist Party of India, and a secretariat member of the party's West Bengal State Committee. On 28 January 2012, he was unanimously elected as the secretary of party's North 24-Parganas District Committee of 69 members, succeeding veteran leader Amitava Bose.

References

Living people
West Bengal MLAs 1987–1991
West Bengal MLAs 1991–1996
West Bengal MLAs 1996–2001
West Bengal MLAs 2001–2006
West Bengal MLAs 2006–2011
Communist Party of India (Marxist) politicians from West Bengal
State cabinet ministers of West Bengal
1954 births